Nimai Bhattacharya (10 April 1931 – 25 June 2020) was a writer of Bengali literature who was born in Magura's Shalikha. He died on 25 June 2020 in Kolkata, aged 89.

Early life
Bhattacharya's mother died when he was three years old. He matriculated  in 1948. He moved to West Bengal from East Bengal. Then he had passed IA and BA from Ripon College, Calcutta. He started his career in journalism. A novel which was written by him was published in Amritobazar in 1963. His next four novels were published in the newspaper. After that, he became professional author.

Notable works
He wrote more than 150 books, one of the most lauded of which was Memsaheb. A film was made based on the book, Mem Saheb (starring Uttam Kumar and Aparna Sen) in leading roles. Some of his notable books are:
 Memsaheb
 Minibus
 Matal
 Inquilab
 Bachelor
 Kerani
 Rajdhani Express
 Anglo Indian
 Darling
 Your Honour
 Cocktail
 Pother Sheshe

References

External links

1931 births
2020 deaths
Bengali writers
Indian writers
People from Magura District
Writers from Kolkata